Holiday is a 1930 American pre-Code romantic comedy film which tells the story of a young man who is torn between his free-thinking lifestyle and the tradition of his wealthy fiancée's family. It stars Ann Harding, Mary Astor, Edward Everett Horton, Robert Ames and Hedda Hopper. It was produced and released by Pathé Exchange.

The film was adapted by Horace Jackson from the 1928 play by Philip Barry.  It was directed by Edward H. Griffith.

Plot summary

Cast

Award nominations
It was nominated for Academy Awards for Best Actress in a Leading Role (Ann Harding) and Best Writing, Adaptation.

Remake
The film was remade in 1938. Directed by George Cukor, it starred Katharine Hepburn and Cary Grant, with Horton reprising his role as Professor Nick Potter from the 1930 version.

References

External links
 
 
 
 

1930 films
1930s romantic comedy-drama films
1930s screwball comedy films
American romantic comedy-drama films
American screwball comedy films
American black-and-white films
1930s English-language films
American films based on plays
American independent films
Pathé Exchange films
Films directed by Edward H. Griffith
1930s independent films
1930s American films
Silent romantic comedy films
Silent romantic drama films